Julián Montenegro (born 23 March 1989) is an Argentine professional footballer who plays for Arsenal Tivat.

Club career
Born in Rio Negro, Montenegro arrived at União Montemor in 2008, to compete in the Regional league, helping the club get promotion into the fourth tier. 

In 2011, he joined F.C. Vizela in the third tier, scoring 8 goals in 24 league matches. This led to a move to the professional divisions, signing with Atlético CP in 2012, and making his debut on 2 September 2012 in loss against Sporting da Covilhã.

After starting less than 10 league games in Atlético, Montenegro joined Boavista, at the time, playing in the third tier. He played only one year at Boavista and was deemed surplus, subsequently moved to Farense, where he spent six months before being released. On 1 February 2016, he signed with Lynx from the Gibraltar Premier Division.

In January 2017, Montenegro was one of the acquisitions of FK Lovćen for the second half of the 2016–17 Montenegrin First League. He scored on his debut league game for Lovćen against FK Jedinstvo.

After two seasons with OFK Grbalj, Montenegro returned to FK Lovćen ahead of the 2019−20 season.

References

External links

1989 births
Living people
People from Río Negro Province
Association football forwards
Argentine footballers
União Montemor players
F.C. Vizela players
Atlético Clube de Portugal players
Boavista F.C. players
S.C. Farense players
Lynx F.C. players
FK Lovćen players
OFK Grbalj players
Liga Portugal 2 players
Primeira Liga players
Montenegrin First League players
Montenegrin Second League players
Argentine expatriate footballers
Expatriate footballers in Portugal
Argentine expatriate sportspeople in Portugal
Expatriate footballers in Gibraltar
Argentine expatriate sportspeople in Gibraltar
Expatriate footballers in Montenegro
Argentine expatriate sportspeople in Montenegro
FK Arsenal Tivat players